The Job Masego Regiment (formerly Regiment Noord-Transvaal) is a reserve mechanised infantry regiment of the South African Army.

History 
Regiment Noord-Transvaal / Regiment Northern Transvaal was a reserve unit formed in 1963 and came into service in January 1964. Regiment Noord-Transvaal was initially an armoured unit. Its headquarters is close to the SA Army Headquarters complex. In those days RNT was part of 16 Armoured Brigade and later 81 Armoured Brigade.

With the SADF

With 16 Brigade
 was one of the original units utilised in this era to develop the mechanization of a conventional force for the SADF under typical South African conditions.

With 81 Brigade
Mechanised training was originally conducted in soft-skinned vehicles which then progressed to Saracens and finally to the Ratel Infantry Fighting vehicle by 1976. 1 RNT was the first unit to be completely outfitted as a mechanised battalion during Exercise Mainstay around 1977.

The second battalion
In 1969, the regiment was split into two battalions 1RNT and 2 RNT

Operations
In 1975, 1RNT re-mustered to  a reserve mechanised infantry unit and took part in the South African Border War in Namibia and at home in counter insurgency operations.

1RNT stayed involved in that conflict to the end, taking part in Operations Moduler, Hooper, Packer and Prone in 1987-8.

2RNT deployed extensively in numerous operations in a Motorised Infantry - Counter Insurgency (COIN) role in the South African Border War as well as on the Rhodesian / Zimbabwe border amongst others in the Soutpansberg Military Area (SMA). It reported into Northern Transvaal command (Later Gauteng Command) and Far Northern Command (73 Brigade) respectively. 2RNT also played a key role in Operation JAMBU in Katlahong / Vosloorus over the election period in 1994, when peace and stability was ensured in the Witwatersrand.

With the SANDF
2RNT was incorporated / amalgamated into Tshwane Regiment along with 5 other Motorised Infantry regiments in 2000.

Name change
In August 2019, 52 Reserve Force units had their names changed to reflect the diverse military history of South Africa. Regiment Noord-Transvaal became the Job Masego Regiment, and have 3 years to design and implement new regimental insignia.

Leadership

1st Battalion

2nd Battalion

Insignia 
The cap badge of RNT was loosely based on the SAS badge but the wings had a different shape and the dagger pointed upwards.

1RNT were the first to wear an infantry beret bar with a Ratel Fighting Vehicle on top of the colours. 2RNT's cap badge was worn with a red felt backing to distinguish it from 1RNT.

Previous Dress Insignia

Current Dress Insignia

Notes

References 

Infantry regiments of South Africa
Military units and formations in Pretoria
Military units and formations established in 1964